Eunicidae is a family of marine polychaetes (bristle worms). The family comprises marine annelids distributed in diverse benthic habitats across Oceania, Europe, South America, North America, Asia and Africa. The Eunicid anatomy typically consists of a pair of appendages near the mouth (mandibles) and complex sets of muscular structures on the head (maxillae) in an eversible pharynx. One of the most conspicuous of the eunicids is the giant, dark-purple, iridescent "Bobbit worm" (Eunice aphroditois), a bristle worm found at low tide under boulders on southern Australian shores. Its robust, muscular body can be as long as 2 m. Eunicidae jaws are known from as far back as Ordovician sediments. Cultural tradition surrounds Palola worm (Palola viridis) reproductive cycles in the South Pacific Islands. Eunicidae are economically valuable as bait in both recreational and commercial fishing. Commercial bait-farming of Eunicidae can have adverse ecological impacts. Bait-farming can deplete worm and associated fauna population numbers, damage local intertidal environments  and introduce alien species to local aquatic ecosystems.

In 2020, Zanol et al. stated, "Species traditionally considered to belong to Eunice are now, also, distributed in two other genera Leodice and Nicidion recently resurrected to reconcile Eunicidae taxonomy with its phylogenetic hypothesis."

History of knowledge 
In 1992, Kristian Fauchald detailed a conclusive history of research and classification of the Eunicidae family. Primary studies undertaken in 1767 on coral reefs in Norway, initially classified Eunicid species under the Nereis family. In 1817, Georges Cuvier created a new genus, Eunice, to classify these and other original taxa. Throughout the 1800s (1832-1878) worm species were added to this genera by Jean Victor Audouin and Henri Milne-Edwards, Kinberg, Edwardsia de Quatrefages, Malmgren, Ehlers and Grube. Following the Challenger and Albatross expeditions, research was expanded by McIntosh and Chamberlain. In 1921 and 1922, Treadwell added new species from coral reefs in the Caribbean Sea and the Pacific Ocean. Species were reviewed and their classifications were refined by Fauvel, Augener and Hartman throughout the early 1900s. In 1944, Hartman codified a system of separate classification for the family, informally grouping North American species using the original suggestions of Ehlers. Hartman's system was expanded and specified by Fauchald in 1970 and later again by Miura in 1986.

Taxonomy 
Thirty-three genera have been described in the Eunicidae family. Only eight are currently considered valid:
 Aciculomarphysa (Hartmann-Schroeder, 1998 in Hartmann-Schroder & Zibrowius 1998)
 Eunice (Cuvier, 1817)
 Euniphysa (Wesenberg-Lund, 1949)
 Fauchaldius (Carrera-Parra & Salazar-Vallejo, 1998)
 Lysidice (Lamarck, 1818)
 Marphysa (Quatrefages, 1866)
 Nematonereis (Schmarda, 1861)
 Palola (Gray in Stair, 1847)

Anatomy

Segmented body 
Eunicids can contain up to 1500 segments and span from 10 mm to 6 m in length. Members of the Eunicidae family are distinguished from other families in Eunicida by having a rear segment with 1-3 antennae and no ringed bases on their antennae. The first body segment of Eunicidae is either whole or consists of two lobes. The gills of live specimens are typically identifiable by their bright red colour.

Head and jaws 
A pair of slender and cylindrical sensory appendages are typically situated near the head of Eunicidae. The lips of Eunicidae can be either reduced or well-developed. In the Eunice species, worms have five appendages on two elongated segmented appendages and three antennae near their heads. This feature is not part of the anatomy of all genera in the Eunicidae family. Eunicidae jaws are typically well developed and partly visible on the underside of the worm or on its surface at the front of the mouth in a complex structure.

Body wall 
Some species of Eunicidae have extensions of the body wall that loop into the vascular system. These usually consist of either comb-like or single filaments.

Ecology

Distribution and habitat 
Eunicidae are distributed in diverse benthic habitats across Oceania, Europe, South America, North America, Asia and Africa. Eunicids play an ecological role in benthic communities, exhibiting a preference for subtidal hard substrates in shallow temperate waters, tropical waters and mangrove swamps. Most species of Eunicidae inhabit cracks and crevices in assorted rubble, rock, and sand environments. In limestone or coral reefs, Eunicids burrow into hard parchment-like tube corals or remain in crevices of calcareous algae.

Diet 
Eunicid diets vary across genera. For example, the Eunice aphroditois crawl on the seafloor where they scavenge in a carnivorous feeding pattern on marine worms, small crustaceans, molluscs, algae and detritus. Other species, for example Euniphysa tubifex and large Eunice, hunt the surrounds of their coral habitats and feed on the decaying flesh of dead sea-life. Burrowing species of Eunicidae (Lysidice and Palola) are primarily herbivores. These species feed on matured corals and contained organisms or on types of algae. The diet of Marphysa species of Eunicidae is variable, some worms are herbivores, some are carnivores  and others omnivores.

Threats 
The practice of harvesting polychaetes (including species in the Eunicidae family) as bait may have negative ecological impacts on intertidal habitats and on worm population numbers. In 2019, Cabral et al. found that Marphysa sanguinea are placed at risk by overfishing and unlicensed harvesting in Portugal. The ecological impacts of bait harvesting activity can also effect associated fauna populations  as well as sediment quality  and bioavailability of heavy metals. Research indicates that mudworm survival and growth may also be effected by changes in salinity rates.

Ecological impact 
Importing Eunicidae species is an established alternative to exploiting local populations for bait. This process may lead to accidental species introductions or invasions. Alien species can threaten the foundation of local ecosystems by altering food webs, habitat structures and gene pools. Alien species can also introduce diseases and parasites. Six species of Eunice, one species of Euniphysa, three species of Lysidice and one species of Marphysa sp. were identified as alien in local aquatic ecosystems across the Mediterranean, the Red Sea, the USA Pacific and the North Sea. Live bait worms are often emptied into the water body by anglers at the end of a fishing session, this is another practice that can introduce alien species to aquatic ecosystems.

Life cycle

Sexual reproduction 

Most of the class Polychaeta are benthic sexual reproductive animals and lack external reproductive organs. When mating, female polychaetes produce a pheromone that induces a mutual release of male sperm and female eggs. This process of synchronous reproduction in the form of a swarm is known as epitoky. During this process, there is no actual male to female contact. The reproductive swarm is ejected into open water. Cells that fuse during fertilisation (gametes) are spawned through an excretory gland (metanephridia) or by the main worm body-wall rupturing. Post-fertilisation, most eggs become planktonic; although some remain inside the worm tubes or burrow in external jelly masses attached to the tubes. Epitokes can draw an increased number of pelagic predators. In the Florida Keys for example, the swarming of Eunice fucata is a highly publicised in local fishing communities, attracting a large gathering of tarpon. These mass swarming events, or ‘risings’, are a spectacle that is the foundation of local tradition in Samoa, Fiji, Tonga, Papua New Guinea, Vanuatu, Kiribati and Indonesia.

Human relations

As bait in commercial and recreational fishing 

Marphysa sanguinea, or known locally in Italy as “Murrido”, “Murone”, “Bacone” and “Verme sanguigno” is the most valuable bait of all Polychaete species collected in Italy. This species is also cultivated in USA and South Korea and is typically commercially harvested once at its optimal length of 20–30 cm. Marphysa sanguinea can reach up to 50 cm long and is collected by excavating in deep sediment. For example, in the Venice lagoon, fisherman dig below the sediment layers colonised by the nereidids and sieve organic material through coarse screens. This process is also common in Italian coastal areas with intertidal and shallow littoral muddy bottoms. Eunice aphroditois, another sizeable (up to 1 metre in length) species of Eunicidae, is harvested by scuba divers along the Italian Apulia coasts. This species is collected at soft bottom ocean floors at a depth of 10 metres using specialised harvesting instruments that fit into U-shaped parchment tubes where the worm lives. This species of Eunicidae is suitable bait for fish of the Sparidae family and is used in commercial hook and line practice. Species within the Eunicidae family are also caught by recreational and commercial fisherman in estuaries along the West coast of Portugal and in Arcahon Bay in France. Marphysa are propagated and harvested in Australian estuary communities located along the coast of New South Wales and Queensland. Collecting of Marphysa moribidii as bait occurs along the West coast of Peninsular Malaysia, Marphysa elityeni are caught in subsistence fisheries in Africa and Eunice sebastiani have been reported as being harvested for bait in Brazil. Eunicids are also used as supplementary feed for aquaculture. For example, mudworms are a part of the black tiger prawn diet in some Thailand hatcheries.

In legend and culture 

In the Indo-Pacific, during 1-2 nights each year, the epitokes of the Palola viridis species are automatised. The sizeable epitokes (up to 30 cm in length) swim autonomously upwards and rupture, releasing gametes across the surface of the ocean. The epitokes are composed of hundreds of segments, with females emerald in colour and males transitioning from orange to brown during maturation. On ‘rising’ night it is tradition for some local communities to attract epitokes with artificial light sources or using other traditional methods. In Samoa for example, locals wear necklaces made of mosoʻoi flowers and use the fragrant floral scent to attract Palola worms. The epitokes are scooped from the shallows into nets and containers to be consumed raw, or cooked, baked, dried or frozen for later consumption.

See also 
 Bobbit worm (Eunice aphroditois)

References

External links

 
 Special issue of Marine Ecology dedicated to polychaetes
 Key to Families of Polychaetes, Natural History Museum

Annelid families
Extant Ordovician first appearances
Errantia
Polychaetes
Fishing techniques and methods
Samoa
Oceania
Marine animals